Shang Keyuan (born 4 February 1995) is a Chinese swimmer. He competed in the men's 200 metre freestyle event at the 2016 Summer Olympics.

References

External links
 

1995 births
Living people
Olympic swimmers of China
Swimmers at the 2016 Summer Olympics
Place of birth missing (living people)
Medalists at the FINA World Swimming Championships (25 m)
Asian Games medalists in swimming
Asian Games silver medalists for China
Swimmers at the 2018 Asian Games
Medalists at the 2018 Asian Games
People from Shengzhou
Swimmers from Zhejiang
Sportspeople from Shaoxing
Chinese male freestyle swimmers
21st-century Chinese people